The Family Arsenal is a novel by Paul Theroux originally published in 1976. It is a political thriller following the acts of a terrorist cell in London.

Synopsis
The Family Arsenal follows a bitter former American Consul as he blunders into a terrorist commune in search of a cause; seemingly any cause so long as it offers some way of battling evil, which here takes the guise of a heavy-handed government and a gun-running criminal.
 
Shortly after Valentine Hood joins a terrorist cell operating from a nondescript house in a once pleasant street in Deptford, South London, he commits a senselessly quixotic killing. The repercussions from this unsanctioned act ripple far and wide, eventually endangering everything and everyone he has been fighting for. Gradually Hood insinuates himself into the confidences of the suspicious, down-trodden members of his new family as they plan and execute equally pointless atrocities around London, either alone or with the assistance of a bored society hostess, an up-and-coming actress and a man who may or may not allow access to the IRA.

References

Library of Congress Cataloging in Publication Data: PZ4.T394Fam [PS3570.H4] 813'.5'4 76-10212

Novels by Paul Theroux
1976 American novels
American thriller novels
Political thriller novels
Novels about terrorism
Novels set in London
Deptford
American political novels
Books with cover art by Paul Bacon